By-elections to eighteen state assembly constituencies were held in Tamil Nadu on 18 April 2019 together with 2019 Indian general election.
It was considered to be mini-assembly election battle for the power in Tamil Nadu. The ruling government had to prove its majority while the opposition was trying hard to get maximum seats .
There were 22 seats vacant in the Tamil Nadu assembly , By-election took place in two phases and in the first phase for 18 assembly constituencies together with Lok Sabha general election on 18 April 2019 in the state. Remaining 4 assembly constituencies (Ottapidaram, Aravakurichi, Tiruparankundram and Sulur) election was held on 19 May. The counting of votes was conducted on 23 May, and on the same day the results were announced.
Then the by-elections for 2 seats Vikravandi and Nanguneri were conducted on 21 October 2019

By-Election Event

Phase 1
Phase 1 By-Elections will be held for 18 vacant assembly constituencies in Tamil Nadu.

Phase 2
Phase 2 By-Elections will be held for the remaining 4 vacant assembly constituencies in Tamil Nadu.

Notable Party-wise contesting candidates list

There are 36 candidates from the Recognized State political party , 46 candidates from the other registered regional parties and 187 Independent politicians for of total 269 candidates for the 18 seats by-election officially announced by Tamilnadu election commission .

Opinion Polls

Pre-Poll

Exit Polls

Election Results

Constituencywise trends

|-

Source - Election Commission of India

Constituencywise candidate results

Poonamallee

Perambur

Tirupporur

Sholinghur

Gudiyatham (SC)

Ambur

Hosur

Pappireddipatti

Harur (SC)

Nilakottai (SC)

Thiruvarur

Thanjavur

Manamadurai (SC)

Andipatti

Periyakulam (SC)

Sattur

Paramakudi (SC)

Vilathikulam

Aravakurichi

Thirupparankundram

Ottapidaram

Sulur

See also 
Elections in Tamil Nadu
Government of Tamil Nadu
Legislature of Tamil Nadu

References

State Assembly elections in Tamil Nadu
2010s in Tamil Nadu
2019 State Assembly elections in India
By-elections in Tamil Nadu